The eleventh edition of the Gent–Wevelgem's women's race was held on Sunday 27 March 2022. It was the fifth event of the 2022 UCI Women's World Tour.

Teams
All fourteen UCI Women's WorldTeams and ten UCI Women's Continental Teams will compete in the race.

UCI Women's WorldTeams

 
 
 
 
 
 
 
 
 
 
 
 
 
 

UCI Women's Continental Teams

 
 
 
 
 Cofidis

Result

See also
 2022 in women's road cycling

References

Gent-Wevelgem
Gent-Wevelgem
Gent–Wevelgem
Gent-Wevelgem (women's race)